Royal Air Force Elvington or more simply RAF Elvington is a former Royal Air Force station which operated from the beginning of the Second World War until 1992 located at Elvington, Yorkshire, England.

History

Royal Air Force use
The station was originally a grass airfield within No. 4 Group RAF.  In the early 1940s the airfield was entirely reconstructed with three hardened runways replacing the grass. It re-opened in October 1942 as a station for 77 Squadron RAF  and along with RAF Melbourne and RAF Pocklington was known as "No. 42 Base".  The squadron had a strength of approximately 20 aircraft and initially used the twin engined Armstrong Whitworth Whitley medium bomber although this was quickly replaced by the Handley Page Halifax four engined heavy bomber which was being introduced.  No. 77 Squadron suffered heavy losses during its time at Elvington with over 500 aircrew killed, missing or taken prisoner and almost 80 Halifaxes lost as it played a major part in the Battle of the Ruhr and the bombing of Berlin.

In May 1944 No. 77 Squadron posted to the newly opened nearby RAF Full Sutton and was replaced at Elvington by two French squadrons, numbers 346 "Guyenne" and 347 "Tunisie" who both played a leading part in the bombing of Germany.  Elvington was the only airfield in the United Kingdom used by the remainder of the Free French Forces, they also flew Handley Page Halifax heavy bombers until they moved to Bordeaux in October 1945 where they became the basis for the new air force of liberated France. In September 1957 a memorial was unveiled in Elvington village dedicated to the two French squadrons. While they were at RAF Elvington nearly half of the squadrons' members were killed.

After the war the  airfield was transferred to No. 40 Group RAF under the control of RAF Maintenance Command until 1952 when it was greatly enlarged and extended for use by the United States Air Force.

United States Air Force use

The United States Air Force (USAF) built a new  runway, which was the longest in the north of England, and a huge  rectangular hardstanding apron as well as a new control tower to turn Elvington into a "Basic Operation Platform" which would have operated as a Strategic Air Command (SAC) dispersal airfield. After spending £4 million  the airfield never became operational as a SAC base and was abandoned by the US Air Force in 1958.

Other uses

In the early 1960s the Blackburn Aircraft Company, now part of British Aerospace used the runway for test flights of the Blackburn Buccaneer. Elvington retained its status as an RAF relief landing ground and was used by the RAF flying training schools at RAF Church Fenton and RAF Linton-on-Ouse until the airfield was finally closed in March 1992.

Motorsport

A race circuit was established which appears to have been used by the British Racing and Sports Car Club (BRSCC). The inaugural car race meeting took place on 8 July 1962 and was reported by Autosport, which said that the BRSCC hoped to run a further meeting September, but this appears not to have taken place. A second meeting did take place a year after on 7 July 1963, but these two appear to have been the sum total of car racing at Elvington.

However, in June 1970 Auto 66 Club held a Motorcycle Road Race meeting at Elvington, with a second meeting in September. The following season these were upgraded to National Status events. Although local critics thought the club had gone well over the top, but the National event attracted over 400 riders, including stars of the future like Mick Grant and Barry Sheene. The Auto 66 Club continued to organise meetings at this track.

Record breaking
In October 1969, when preparing for a challenge at the Monza high-speed banked-oval circuit to a record held by Moto Guzzi, Ray Pickrell practiced by riding a Dunstall Norton road-going motorcycle during a regular sprint meeting.

On 3 October 1970 Tony Densham, driving the Ford-powered "Commuter" dragster, set the Official outright wheel driven record at Elvington by averaging  over the flying kilometre course. This broke Malcolm Campbell's record set 43 years previously at Pendine Sands.

In 1990 Elvington hosted an attempt to match the speed record run of the Sunbeam Tiger motor car, originally driven by Henry Segrave (on 21 March 1926, he set his first land speed record in his 4-litre Sunbeam Tiger Ladybird on the sands at Southport, England at 152.33 mph).

On 20 September 2006 Elvington Airfield was the location of a serious crash involving the Top Gear presenter Richard Hammond and "Vampire". Hammond suffered serious brain injuries, but made a full recovery. The accident investigation said: "an almost instantaneous blow out of the right side front tyre caused the accident."

Zef Eisenberg of MADMAX Race team, who holds numerous land speed records, crashed his 560 hp Rolls-Royce Turbine powered motorbike at Elvington airfield on 18 September 2016, during a two way speed record attempt. It was reported that he did not see the finish line, causing him to leave the end of the runway and crash at a speed of around 230 mph. He sustained 11 broken bones and was hospitalised for three months. It was believed to be Britain's fastest motorbike crash survivor. After rebuilding his Turbine powered bike and making a recovery that surprised the doctors, he was racing again on the anniversary of the crash at the same track and on the same (rebuilt) bike. On the afternoon of 1 October 2020, Eisenberg died in a collision whilst attempting to set a British land speed record.

In 2019 Guy Martin set a new speed record for driving a tractor at the site.

In 2023 Professional Skateboarder and Presenter Ryan Swain announced he was to attempt a Guinness World Records in skateboarding at Elvington on 8 May 2023 in aid of Mind mental health charity. He will be attempting to skateboard over 300 miles in less than 24 hours and will be the first GB Skateboarder to hold the record if completed.

Present day
The airfield is now owned by Elvington Park Ltd. The adjacent buildings and control tower have been restored, and serve as the Yorkshire Air Museum which has many varied and rare aircraft and exhibits, including a complete Halifax bomber.
Elvington is also a popular motorsports venue for motorcycle racing.

References

Citations

Bibliography

Further reading
Bruce Barrymore Halpenny Bomber Aircrew of World War II: True Stories of Frontline Air Combat

External links

 The History of RAF Elvington
 Imperial War Museums' collection of photographs from RAF Elvington
 Photographs of Elvington

Royal Air Force stations in Yorkshire
Royal Air Force stations of World War II in the United Kingdom